Ulupna is a locality in the north of the Australian state of Victoria. The locality is basically Ulupna Island, an inland island bordered by Ulupna Creek and the Murray River. The island is a popular camping destination. In 2016 the Population was 23.  

The Ulupna post office opened on 10 February 1879, closed on 11 April 1892, reopened on 1896 and closed on 1 July 1926. A school was opened in 1884 and closed in 1953

References

Towns in Victoria (Australia)
Shire of Moira